Dogtooth spar is a speleothem that consists of very large calcite crystals resembling dogs' teeth. They form through mineral precipitation of water-borne calcite. Dogtooth spar crystals are found in caves, open spaces including veins and fractures, and geodes.

The crystals are generally centimeters long, but anomalous samples decimeters long exist, notably in Sitting Bull Crystal Caverns. A layer of crystalline calcite can be found underneath the surface of crystal points.

The crystals typically consist of acute scalenohedrons, twelve triangular crystal faces that ideally form scalene triangles.  However, modification of these faces is common, and some may have many more than three edges.  Calcite crystallizes in the rhombohedral system, and the most common scalenohedron form has the Miller index [211].

Spar is a general term for transparent to translucent, generally light-colored and vitreous crystalline minerals.

References

External links 
The Virtual Cave:Spar 

Speleothems